Sheykh Sorkh ol Din-e Olya (also Romanized as Sheykh Sorkh ol Dīn-e ‘Olyā and Sheykh Sorkh od Dīn-e ‘Olyā; also known as Sheykh Seyr Ad Dīn and Sheykh Sorkh ed Dīn) is a village in Howmeh Rural District, in the Central District of Gilan-e Gharb County, Kermanshah Province, Iran. At the 2006 census, its population was 61, in 13 families.

References 

Populated places in Gilan-e Gharb County